Chris Welch (born ) is an English music journalist, critic, and author who is best known for his work from the late 1960s as a reporter for Melody Maker, Musicians Only, and Kerrang!. He is the author of over 40 music books.

Early life
Welch was raised in Catford, south east London. He left school at 16 and became a messenger for a national daily newspaper in Fleet Street.

Career
In 1960, Welch started work for The Kentish Times. In October 1964, after writing for a local newspaper, Welch became a reporter for Melody Maker at age 22. His first interview was with the Yardbirds with Eric Clapton. He was later assistant editor of Musicians Only, editor of Metal Hammer, and a contributor to The Independent and Rhythm magazine. He has written books on several rock music personalities, including Jimi Hendrix, Yes, Steve Winwood, Black Sabbath, John Bonham, Led Zeppelin, Peter Grant, and Cream. He has also written liner notes for many rock albums.

On 17 October 2012 Welch was presented with a BASCA Gold Badge Award in recognition of his unique contribution to music.

Published works
Adam & The Ants  (1981)
Black Sabbath  (1982)
Led Zeppelin: The Book  (1984)
Paul McCartney: The Definitive Biography  (1984)
Power and Glory: Jimmy Page and Robert Plant  (1985)
Def Leppard: An Illustrated Biography  (1986)
Take You Higher: The Tina Turner Story  (1986)
The Tina Turner Experience  (1987)
Pink Floyd: Learning to Fly  (1994)
Cream: Strange Brew  (1994)
The Complete Guide to the Music of Genesis  (1995)
The Who: Teenage Wasteland  (1995)
Dazed and Confused: The Story Behind Every Led Zeppelin Song  (1998)
Changes: The Story Behind Every David Bowie Song, 1970–1980  (1999)
Cream  (2000)
John Bonham: A Thunder of Drums (with Geoff Nicholls)  (2001)
Ginger Geezer: The Life of Vivian Stanshall (with Lucian Randall)  (2002)
Peter Grant: The Man Who "Led Zeppelin"  (2002)
Close to the Edge – The Story of Yes  (2003)
Genesis: Complete Guide to Their Music  (2005)
Led Zeppelin: Experience The Biggest Band Of The 70s  (2014)

References

External links
Backbeat Books Cream biography article
World Cat bibliography

1941 births
Living people
British music journalists
Melody Maker writers
British music critics
Jazz writers
English biographers